The 1941 Railway Cup Hurling Championship was the 15th series of the Railway Cup, an annual hurling championship organised by the Gaelic Athletic Association. The championship took place between 16 February and 16 March 1941. It was contested by Connacht, Leinster and Munster.

Munster entered the championship as the defending champions.

On 16 March 1941, Leinster won the Railway Cup after a 2–05 to 2–04 defeat of Munster in the final at Croke Park, Dublin. It was their 6th Railway Cup title overall and their first since 1936.

Munster's Jack Lynch was the Railway Cup's top scorer with 2-02.

Results

Semi-final

Final

Top scorers

Overall

Single game

Sources

 Donegan, Des, The Complete Handbook of Gaelic Games (DBA Publications Limited, 2005).

External links
 Munster Railway Cup-winning teams

Railway Cup Hurling Championship
Railway Cup Hurling Championship